Guillermo González del Río García, nicknamed Campanal I or Guillermo Campanal (born 9 February 1912 in Avilés; died 22 January 1984 in Seville) was a Spanish footballer. During his career he played for Sporting de Gijón and Sevilla FC (1929–1946), and earned 3 caps and scored 2 goals for the Spain national football team, and participated in the 1934 FIFA World Cup.

He later became manager of Sevilla FC.

Honours
Sevilla
 La Liga: 1945–46
 Copa del Rey: 1935, 1939

References

External links
Profile

1912 births
1984 deaths
People from Avilés
Footballers from Asturias
Spanish footballers
Spain international footballers
1934 FIFA World Cup players
Sporting de Gijón players
Sevilla FC players
Spanish football managers
Sevilla FC managers
CD Málaga managers
Association football forwards